The Portland Documentary and eXperimental Film Festival, or PDX Fest, is a five-day event that showcases non-narrative film and video from Portland, Oregon, United States and around the world.  The film festival was started in 2001 by filmmaker Matt McCormick and has since been credited with helping turn Portland into a hotbed of experimental film and new media production.  

The Portland Documentary and eXperimental Film Festival is also home of the Peripheral Produce Invitational which every year crowns the world champion of experimental film.

External links
Official site

Film festivals in Oregon
Festivals in Portland, Oregon
Documentary film festivals in the United States
Experimental film festivals
2001 establishments in Oregon
Annual events in Portland, Oregon